There are over 100 listed buildings in Luton, a large town in Bedfordshire, England. A listed building is one considered to be of special architectural, historical or cultural significance, and has been placed on the statutory list maintained by Historic England, to protect it from being demolished, extended, or altered without special permission from the local planning authority. There are around 400,000 listed buildings in England overall.

Clicking on the entry number for each will show the full listing description from Historic England.

Buildings

See also

 List of churches in Luton
 Buildings and structures in Luton

Notes

References

External links

 Listed buildings at Luton Council's website
 Buildings on the Statutory List (PDF) from Luton Council
 Luton Heritage Forum
 Luton at British Listed Buildings

Listed buildings in Luton
Lists of listed buildings in Bedfordshire
Luton-related lists